Thrum's Hawaiian Annual (fully Thrum's Hawaiian Annual and Standard Guide; alternatively All About Hawaii) is a statistical compendium of Hawaiiana ranging from Hawaiian mythology to Hawaiian language to sites of interest in Hawaii, published by Star-Bulletin Printing Co. The original research was compiled by antiquarian bookman Thomas George Thrum and first published in 1875 as The Hawaiian Annual and Almanac.  Contributors to Thrum's Hawaiian Annual include the artist Bessie Wheeler.

In 1908 the Hamilton Library acquired the Thrum Hawaiiana collection.

Further reading
 Thomas G. Thrum, More Hawaiian Folk Tales, Chicago, 1923
 Thomas G. Thrum, Hawaiian Folk Tales: A Collection of Native Legends, International Law & Taxation Publishers, 2001
 Thomas G. Thrum, More Hawaiian Folk Tales: A Collection of Native Legends and Traditions, International Law & Taxation Publishers, 2001

External links
Thrum's Hawaiian Annual at University of Hawaii at Manoa
Thrum's Online Library Guide at University of Hawaii at Manoa

Hawaiiana
Travel guide books
Publishing companies of the United States
Books about Hawaii
Publishing companies established in 1875
1875 establishments in Hawaii